Max Rooke (born Jarad Maxwell Rooke on 19 December 1981) is a former Australian rules footballer, who played for the Geelong Football Club in the Australian Football League (AFL). Rooke made his AFL debut in 2002, and was awarded the 2003 Geelong Football Club most determined and dedicated player award. He went on to become a dual premiership player with the club, playing key roles in both the 2007 and 2009 Grand Final victories. Rooke also won two NAB Cups and two McClelland Trophies with Geelong. He has served as a development coach at the Melbourne Football Club since November 2016.

AFL career

Rooke was recruited from Casterton in 2001, and made his debut in the second round of 2002. He was a regular senior player until a shin injury forced him to miss the second half of 2004, including the finals series, but recovered to play all but one game in 2005.

His lack of pace against small forwards was exposed in round 20, 2005 when 's, Russell Robertson kicked six goals against him. This prompted coach Mark Thompson to move him into the midfield the following week. This move was successful, with Rooke nullifying champion midfielder Chris Judd. In Geelong's close loss to the Sydney Swans in the elimination final, Rooke amassed a remarkable fifteen tackles.

Rooke missed out on most of the 2007 season after suffering a potential season-ending 7 cm hamstring tear in round 13. On 12 July, Geelong spent $20,000 on Rooke to receive treatment by soft-tissue expert Dr Hans-Wilhelm Muller-Wohlfarth in Germany.

In October 2010, Rooke announced his retirement from AFL football due to an acute knee injury which kept him out for most of the 2010 home and away season.

Coaching career
Rooke returned to Geelong in 2011 as a development coach for four seasons before joining  as a development coach for the 2016 season. In November 2016, he joined  as a development coach.

Personal life
In November 2006, Rooke made the decision to officially change his legal name to Max. Rooke's middle name at birth was Maxwell and both his grandfathers were known as Max, which led to a fondness of the name as the main reason behind the change. He also sported a new wild 1970's hairstyle and beard. Rooke was known by the new name in all official AFL records from the 2007 season onwards, in the same vein of the Western Bulldog's Brian Lake's name change from his original "Brian Harris".

Statistics

|-
|- style="background-color: #EAEAEA"
! scope="row" style="text-align:center" | 2002
|style="text-align:center;"|
| 33 || 15 || 1 || 0 || 93 || 69 || 162 || 37 || 26 || 0.1 || 0.0 || 6.2 || 4.6 || 10.8 || 2.5 || 1.7
|-
! scope="row" style="text-align:center" | 2003
|style="text-align:center;"|
| 33 || 18 || 3 || 3 || 134 || 103 || 237 || 74 || 38 || 0.2 || 0.2 || 7.4 || 5.7 || 13.2 || 4.1 || 2.1
|- style="background-color: #EAEAEA"
! scope="row" style="text-align:center" | 2004
|style="text-align:center;"|
| 33 || 11 || 0 || 1 || 51 || 47 || 98 || 38 || 18 || 0.0 || 0.1 || 4.6 || 4.3 || 8.9 || 3.5 || 1.6
|-
! scope="row" style="text-align:center" | 2005
|style="text-align:center;"|
| 33 || 23 || 3 || 1 || 131 || 129 || 260 || 88 || 68 || 0.1 || 0.0 || 5.7 || 5.6 || 11.3 || 3.8 || 3.0
|- style="background-color: #EAEAEA"
! scope="row" style="text-align:center" | 2006
|style="text-align:center;"|
| 33 || 17 || 8 || 1 || 114 || 121 || 235 || 62 || 55 || 0.5 || 0.1 || 6.7 || 7.1 || 13.8 || 3.6 || 3.2
|-
! scope="row" style="text-align:center;" | 2007
|style="text-align:center;"|
| 33 || 8 || 6 || 3 || 38 || 45 || 83 || 26 || 27 || 0.8 || 0.4 || 4.8 || 5.6 || 10.4 || 3.3 || 3.4
|- style="background-color: #EAEAEA"
! scope="row" style="text-align:center" | 2008
|style="text-align:center;"|
| 33 || 20 || 13 || 4 || 113 || 156 || 269 || 84 || 70 || 0.7 || 0.2 || 5.7 || 7.8 || 13.5 || 4.2 || 3.5
|-
! scope="row" style="text-align:center;" | 2009
|style="text-align:center;"|
| 33 || 22 || 24 || 15 || 135 || 108 || 243 || 97 || 76 || 1.1 || 0.7 || 6.1 || 4.9 || 11.0 || 4.4 || 3.5
|- style="background-color: #EAEAEA"
! scope="row" style="text-align:center" | 2010
|style="text-align:center;"|
| 33 || 1 || 0 || 1 || 3 || 5 || 8 || 2 || 2 || 0.0 || 1.0 || 3.0 || 5.0 || 8.0 || 2.0 || 2.0
|- class="sortbottom"
! colspan=3| Career
! 135
! 58
! 29
! 812
! 783
! 1595
! 508
! 380
! 0.4
! 0.2
! 6.0
! 5.8
! 11.8
! 3.8
! 2.8
|}

References

External links

Living people
1981 births
Geelong Football Club players
Geelong Football Club Premiership players
Casterton Football Club players
Australian rules footballers from Victoria (Australia)
People from Casterton, Victoria
Australia international rules football team players
Two-time VFL/AFL Premiership players